Columbia College may refer to one of several institutions of higher education in North America:

Canada
 Columbia College (Alberta), in Calgary
 Columbia College (British Columbia), a two-year liberal arts institution in Vancouver
 Columbia International College, a private preparatory school in Hamilton, Ontario

United States
Listed alphabetically by state
 Columbia College (California), a community college in Sonora, California
 Columbia College Hollywood, a film school in Los Angeles, California
 Columbia College (Florida), an historical college in Lake City, Florida, now merged with Stetson University
 Columbia College Chicago, a large arts and communications college in Chicago, Illinois
 Loras College, a private Catholic college in Dubuque, Iowa, known as Columbia College during 1920–1939
 Columbia College (Missouri), a liberal arts college in Columbia, Missouri
 Columbia University, New York, known as Columbia College during 1784–1896
 Columbia College (New York), the university's oldest undergraduate college
 Columbia College (Oregon), a former college in Eugene, Oregon
 Milton-Freewater City Hall, a building in Milton-Freewater, Oregon, listed on the National Register of Historic Places as Columbia College
 Columbia College (South Carolina), a private women's liberal arts college in Columbia
 Columbia College (Virginia), a private vocational college in Vienna, Centreville, Virginia, and in Silver Spring, Maryland
 Columbia College of Nursing, Glendale, Wisconsin

See also
 Columba College, a Presbyterian school in Dunedin, New Zealand
 Columbia University (disambiguation)
 Columbian College, former name of George Washington University
 Columbia State Community College, Columbia, Tennessee
 Lower Columbia College, Longview, Washington